is a Japanese company that produces vinegars (including seasoned rice vinegars, balsamic vinegars, and wine vinegars), mustards, salad dressings, authentic East Asian sauces, nattō, and other food products. It is based in Handa, Aichi Prefecture, near Nagoya.

History
The company was founded in Handa in 1804 by Matazaemon Nakano, who began producing rice vinegar using byproducts from the production of sake (rice alcohol). Nakano named his company the Mitsukan Group. In the late 1970s Mitsukan expanded from Japan into the United States and began acquiring regional condiment companies. The group was officially registered as a corporate entity in July 1977. In 1995, in honour of its founder, the U.S. arm of the business changed its name to Nakano Foods. In 2004, the Mitsukan Group became The Mizkan Group Corporation, and Nakano Foods became Mizkan America.

Present
Mizkan's product range includes: vinegars, seasoned rice vinegars, balsamic vinegars, wine vinegars, mustards, jellies, salad dressings, and authentic Asian sauces. The company's president is Matazaemon Kazuhide Nakano VIII.

In July 2012 the British company Premier Foods sold its Sarson's vinegar, Haywards pickled onion and Dufrais vinegar brands to Mizkan for £41m as part of a streamlining programme. Also in late 2012 the Branston pickle brand was sold to Mizkan.

In May 2014, it bought the US Ragú and Bertolli pasta and sauce brands from the British multinational Unilever for $2.15 billion.

References

External links

Brand name condiments
Food and drink companies of Japan
Companies based in Aichi Prefecture
 
Japanese companies established in 1804
Japanese brands
Food and drink companies established in 1804
Condiment companies